Timothy M. Manganello (born 1950)  is an American automotive businessman. He was the chief executive officer and chairman of BorgWarner until 2013.

Biography

Education 
Manganello graduated from the University of Michigan in 1972, with a degree in mechanical engineering. He received a master's degree in mechanical engineering from the University in 1975. He attended Harvard Business School's six-week Advanced Management Program.

Career 
Manganello began his automotive career at Chrysler Corporation in engineering management areas. He also worked in sales for PT Components-LinkBelt. 
Manganello became chief executive officer of BorgWarner in 2003; he had held senior positions within the company since 1989.

References

External links 
BorgWarner's CEO Profile

1950 births
Living people
University of Michigan College of Engineering alumni
American chief executives of manufacturing companies
Businesspeople from Michigan